{{Infobox person
| name           = Betsy Russell
| image          = Russell, Betsy (2007).jpg
| imagesize      = 
| caption        = Russell in October 2007
| birth_date     = 
| birth_place    = San Diego, California, U.S.
| death_date     =
| death_place    = 
| othername      = 
| education      = University of Santa Monica
| known_for      = {{ubl|Private School|Saw franchise}}
| occupation     =  
| yearsactive    = 1982–present
| spouse         = 
| children       = 2
| website        = 
| parents        = Richard Russell
| relatives      = Max Lerner (maternal grandfather)
| signature      = Betsy Russell Signature.png
}}

Betsy Russell (born September 6, 1963) is an American actress who is best known for her roles in Private School (1983), Tomboy (1985), and as Jill Tuck, one of the primary characters of the Saw film series from 2006 to 2010.

Early life
Russell was born in San Diego, California, on September 6, 1963, the daughter of Constance (née Lerner) and Richard Lion Russell, a stock analyst. Russell was the granddaughter of journalist and educator Max Lerner. Her father and maternal grandfather were Jewish. Russell wanted to be an actress since the age of eight and started acting in school plays. She appeared in a Pepsi commercial that was taped locally while in high school. She graduated from Mission Bay High School in 1981. She did a masters program in Spiritual Psychology at the University of Santa Monica and is a certified hypnotist and life coach, also from the University of Santa Monica.

Career
Russell's first role was in the 1982 film Let's Do It!. That same year, she landed roles on T. J. Hooker, Family Ties, and The Powers of Matthew Star. In 1983, Russell's breakout role came as Jordan Leigh-Jensen in the sex comedy Private School. While shooting the action film Avenging Angel, she was offered to audition for the 1985 film Silverado but turned it down. She said in an interview, "Everything happens for a reason. I always believe my career would have been different had I done that part. I can't say if it would have been better or worse. I’ve had a great run." She went on to star in a series of B movies in the 1980s, including the comedy Tomboy and the slasher film Cheerleader Camp. Russell also appeared on TV series such as The A-Team, Murder, She Wrote, 1st & Ten, and an episode of Superboy, which was a reunion with her Tomboy co-star Gerard Christopher.

After a brief retirement from acting, Russell appeared in a small role in Saw III playing John Kramer's ex-wife, Jill Tuck. She went on to star in the sequels, Saw IV, Saw V, Saw VI, and Saw 3D. She played a role in the 2010 film Chain Letter, the SyFy film Mandrake, and My Trip Back to the Dark Side''.

Personal life
In August 1988, Russell was engaged to actor Vincent Van Patten, son of Dick Van Patten. They were married nine months later on May 27, 1989, in North Hollywood. Their wedding reception was at Van Patten's father's Sherman Oaks home. They divorced in 2001 and have two sons. Russell was previously engaged to film producer Mark Burg.

Russell resides in Malibu, California.

Credits

Film

Television

References

External links
 
 
 
 

1963 births
Living people
20th-century American actresses
21st-century American actresses
Actresses from San Diego
American film actresses
American television actresses
Jewish American actresses
University of Santa Monica alumni
Van Patten family
21st-century American Jews